The dusky-cheeked fig parrot (Cyclopsitta melanogenia) is a species of parrot in the family Psittaculidae.
It is found in southern New Guinea and Aru Island.
Its natural habitat is subtropical or tropical moist lowland forests.

Subspecies 
There are three recognised subspecies of the dusky-cheeked fig parrot. 

 C. g. melanogenia – Rosenberg, 1866: Also known as the dusky-cheeked fig parrot.
 C. g. suavissima – Sclater, 1876:
C. g. fuscifrons – Salvadori, 1876:

References

Cyclopsitta
Birds of New Guinea
Birds described in 1866